Siri is Apple's virtual assistant application.

Siri or SIRI may also refer to:

People
 Siri (given name), including a list of people with the name
 Siri (surname), including a list of people with the name

Arts and entertainment

Fictional characters
Siri, the protagonist in the Epic of Siri, an epic Tulu-language poem 
Siri, in Dan Simmons's novel Hyperion
Siri, in Brandon Sanderson's novel Warbreaker
Siri Keeton, in Peter Watts's novel Blindsight
Siri Tachi, in Jude Watson's series Star Wars: Jedi Apprentice
Siri, a doll in the Groovy Girls line by Manhattan Toy
Siri, in the 2003 film Rugrats Go Wild
Siri, a Super-Skrull from Marvel Comics

Other uses in arts and entertainment
 Siri (play), a 2015 Tulu drama
 "Siri" (song), by Romeo Santos featuring Chris Lebron, 2022
 "Siri", a song by Lil Wayne featuring 2 Chainz from the 2018 deluxe album Tha Carter V

Places
 Siri Fort, one of the seven cities of Delhi 
 Siri Lake, Kaghan Valley, Pakistan
 Siri, a crude oil field in the Badejo Field off the coast of Brazil
 Siri Waterfall, Gaua Island, Vanuatu
 332 Siri, a main-belt asteroid

Other uses
 Siri language, an Afro-Asiatic language
 Service Interface for Real Time Information, an XML protocol 
 Sirius XM, stock symbol is SIRI

See also
 
 Seri (disambiguation)
 Series (disambiguation)
 Siris (disambiguation)
 Sri (disambiguation)
 Sirri Island, an island in the Persian Gulf belonging to Iran
 SyRI, an algorithmic welfare fraud predictor
 SEERI, St. Ephrem Ecumenical Research Institute